Ibanez PGM (Paul Gilbert Model) is an electric guitar from Ibanez Instruments, which was first produced in 1990. The guitar is Racer X and Mr. Big guitarist Paul Gilbert's signature guitar model.

Features 
As of 2007 Ibanez has publicly released 15 PGM guitars including two anniversary models and the acoustic PGA1000.

Most PGM model guitars have the same body shape as the Ibanez RG guitar models with removed tone knob and volume knob placed to Paul Gilbert's personal preference. Some are usually available with a fixed bridge, others such as the PGM30 of 1995 feature a Lo-TRS double-locking tremolo system and a 24-fret maple neck with rosewood, ebony or maple fingerboard. Although PGM guitars come in various colors they all have two painted F-holes which gives the illusion that it is a semi-hollow bodied guitar, and many have a reversed headstock that changes the typical string length and make them easily distinguishable from an Ibanez RG. The short-lived PGM900TC of 1998 was a Talman finished in Transparent Crimson and fitted with dual humbuckers and a stoptail bridge.

Models and variations
 PGM3
 PGM30
 PGM100
 PGM100RE
 PGM200
 PGM300
 PGM300RE
 PGM301
 PGM400
 PGM401
 PGM500
 PGM600
 PGM700
 PGM800
 PGM900
 PGM10th
 PGM90th
 PGM80P
 PGMM31
PGMM21
PGM333
 PGMFRM1

See also
 Ibanez
 Paul Gilbert

References

External links
 PGM Chronicle
 Ibanez official website
 Paul Gilbert official website

P